In the astronomy of the Solar System, Chrysalis is a hypothetical moon of Saturn, named in 2022 by scientists of the Massachusetts Institute of Technology using data from the Cassini–Huygens mission. The moon would have been torn apart by Saturn's tidal forces, somewhere between 200 and 100 million years ago. Up to 99% of the moon's mass would have been swallowed by Saturn, with the remaining 1% forming the rings of Saturn. The origin of Saturn's rings from the destruction of a satellite has been previously proposed by other authors.

Chrysalis was hypothesised to be similar in size and mass to Iapetus, with a similar water-ice composition, and to have orbited somewhere between Iapetus and Titan. Its orbit around Saturn may have been degraded as a result of Titan's orbit expanding due to interactions of the Saturn system with a resonance with Neptune, resulting in the increasing eccentricity of Chrysalis's orbit until being torn apart during a close encounter with Saturn by its parent planet's gravitational force.

The hypothetical moon was named after the pupa stage of a butterfly, with the rings of Saturn representing its emergence from the chrysalis.

See also
 Rings of Saturn#Formation and evolution of main rings

References 

Hypothetical moons
Moons of Saturn
Hypothetical bodies of the Solar System